Lardeya Ice Piedmont is the glacier extending  in north-south direction and  in east-west direction on the east side of Sentinel Range in Ellsworth Mountains, Antarctica.  It is draining the northeast slopes of Flowers Hills to flow into Rutford Ice Stream to the east-northeast and Ellen Glacier to the north.

The feature is named after the medieval fortress of Lardeya in southeastern Bulgaria.

Location
US mapping in 1988.

See also
 List of glaciers in the Antarctic
 Glaciology

Maps
 Vinson Massif.  Scale 1:250 000 topographic map.  Reston, Virginia: US Geological Survey, 1988.
 Antarctic Digital Database (ADD). Scale 1:250000 topographic map of Antarctica. Scientific Committee on Antarctic Research (SCAR). Since 1993, regularly updated.

References

External links
 Lardeya Ice Piedmont SCAR Composite Antarctic Gazetteer
 Bulgarian Antarctic Gazetteer. Antarctic Place-names Commission. (details in Bulgarian, basic data in English)

External links
 Lardeya Ice Piedmont. Copernix satellite image

Glaciers of Ellsworth Land
Bulgaria and the Antarctic